Dawie Steyn (born 5 January 1984) is a retired South African rugby union footballer. He played as a Loosehead Prop. He represented the Bulls in Super Rugby as well as the Blue Bulls in both the Currie Cup and Vodacom Cup. Between 2008 and 2011 he played for the Pumas prior to joining the Bulls for their 2012 Super Rugby season.

External links 

Bulls profile

1984 births
Living people
Afrikaner people
Blue Bulls players
Bulls (rugby union) players
Pumas (Currie Cup) players
Rugby union players from Pretoria
Rugby union props
South African people of Dutch descent
South African rugby union players
University of Pretoria alumni